"That's Why I Lie" is a single by Ray J from the Dr. Dolittle soundtrack. The song charted at #22 in New Zealand and #71 on the UK Singles Chart. The song was produced by Rodney Jerkins, and was later sampled on Brandy's 1998 album Never Say Never.

Track listing
That's Why I Lie (album version)  
That's Why I Lie (radio edit)

1998 singles
Ray J songs
Atlantic Records singles
1998 songs
Songs written by Ray J
Songs written for films